The Mau Escarpment is a fault scarp running along the western edge of the Great Rift Valley in Kenya. The top of the escarpment reaches approximately 3,000 m (10,000 ft) above sea level, and is over 1,000 m higher than the floor of the Rift Valley.

See also
Enkapune Ya Muto

References

External links
 Article published in The East African on the Mau Escarpment and its political and environmental implications: https://web.archive.org/web/20110726142449/http://www.marsgroupkenya.org/multimedia/?StoryID=261885

Escarpments of Kenya
Great Rift Valley